Georgios Moschos (Greek: Γεώργιος Μόσχος; 1937 – 28 December 1966) was a Greek professional basketball player. He played for Panellinios Athens, Iraklis Salonica, and AEK Athens basketball clubs and died from lymphoma at the age of twenty-nine. He was nicknamed Piccolino.

Club career
Moschos began his professional career with the Greek Basket League club Panellinios in the late 50s. At the age of twenty, he won the first championship of his career with the Panellinios basketball club. He moved to Iraklis Salonica in 1960 and played for the club for one year. In 1961, he joined AEK Athens basketball club, where he won four consecutive championships and reached the semifinals of the 1966 FIBA European Champions Cup. On 16 January 2018, AEK Athens basketball club honored the 60s golden generation, and his daughter received the award.

National team career
Moschos represented Greece once in a friendly game against Romania in 1965.

FIBA European selection team
Moschos, alongside Christos Zoupas, represented the country of Greece in the FIBA All-Star Games in 1966.

Awards and accomplishments
 Greek Basket League Winner (5): 1956–57, 1962–63, 1963–64, 1964–65, 1965–1966
 FIBA European Champions Cup Semi-Finalist (1): 1965–66

References

Filmography
 Tassos Boulmetis, 1968 (film), 2018.

External links
Georgios Moschos at eurobasket.com

1937 births
1966 deaths
AEK B.C. players
Panellinios B.C. players
Greek men's basketball players
Point guards
Basketball players from Athens